Blaga Nikolova Dimitrova (2 January 1922 – 2 May 2003) was a Bulgarian poet and the 2nd Vice President of Bulgaria from 1992 until 1993.

Early life
Dimitrova was born in Byala Slatina, Bulgaria. She graduated high school in Sofia in 1941. During the same year in autumn, she enrolls in the Sofia University St. Kliment Ohridski, where she studies slavic philology until graduation in 1945. She continues her studies in the Maxim Gorky Literature Institute in Moscow, as she defends a dissertation on "Mayakovsky and Bulgarian poetry" in 1951. On her return in Bulgaria, she joined the editorial staff of the monthly magazine of the Bulgarian Writers’ Association. In 1962 she joined the editorial staff of the Association’s publishing house, where she tried to publish the works of young authors who had fallen out of favour with the censors.

Intellectual career 
In 1963, after the tirade against the country’s intellectuals by the Secretary of the Bulgarian Communist Party, Todor Zhivkov, the publishing house suspended publications and Blaga left her job in protest and moved to another publishing firm. In 1965 she published her first book, Journey to Oneself. During the Vietnam War she visited that country several times, adopted a young Vietnamese orphan and then published several works resulting from her observations. For many years she worked as an editor in various newspapers, magazines, publishing houses. Dimitrova was engaged in translation and social work, compiles anthologies.

In February 1989 Blaga Dimitrova was one of 102 Bulgarian intellectuals to sign an appeal in defence of Václav Havel.

On 5 May 1989 her husband was arrested because he was the chief editor of the journal “Democracy”, an organ of the “Association of Democratic Forces”.

Together with a group of intellectuals, she was invited on January 20, 1989 to the so-called breakfast with French President François Mitterrand. This is an opportune moment for the SDS to announce it as its symbol. Believing that with her participation, changes for a better life could occur in our country, Blaga Dimitrova actively participated in the organized rallies, not admitting for a moment that the behind-the-scenes games and intrigues were organized by the leaders of the democratic changes.

Vice President 
In the presidential elections held on January 19, 1992, Blaga Dimitrova was elected vice-president and Zhelyu Zhelev was elected president of the Republic of Bulgaria. She worked in this position for no more than a year and a half. Disappointed and oppressed by the way the presidency and the government work, on July 6, 1993, she left the vice-presidential post with an open letter. In an interview with a capital newspaper, she said: "The post of vice president gave me the opportunity to face people's characters, to understand what power is. You cannot imagine how a person changes in a certain environment. Even at home, I noticed such a change with horror. The poetess kept a long silence on political topics after her message.

Poetry 
She published her first poems in the magazine "Bulgarian Speech" as a student in 1938, as of only 16 years old. As the only child of parents: a lawyer and a teacher from Veliko Tarnovo moved to the capital so that their child could develop the intellectual capabilities that her father and mother believed in. Later, as a high school student at the First Girls' High School in the capital, under the skilled and caring guidance of her Bulgarian language and literature teacher Manya Miletich, Blaga Dimitrova began to publish in various newspapers and magazines. She would publish her first book, called ''Journey to Oneself'' in 1961. 

After the suicide in Prague of Jan Palach and the invasion of Czechoslovakia, she wrote her poem Jan Palach, which she managed to smuggle to the dissidents in Prague. The Seventies marked the peak of her poetic production, with the publication of a number of books that re-awakened the Bulgarians’ conscience. Along with her husband, the literary critic Jordan Vasiliev, in 1975 she published Bagrian’s youth and Black days and white days, a sort of biography of the great Bulgarian poet Elisavieta Bagrian. Since the text mentions authors banned by the propaganda, the books were confiscated and the authors accused of “falsifying history”. In 1981, after four years’ attempts, she successfully published Face, a metaphor of the totalitarian regime and the void it provokes in people, in which she wrote:

Despite the cuts made by the censors, the book was confiscated anyway, slammed by the critics, who accused the author of being on the payroll of a foreign power. The few remaining copies were transcribed on the typewriter and distributed underground throughout the country.

During the first free demonstration in Sofia, in November 1989, alongside the banners the crowd raised two books in the air: Fascism by Zelu Zelev and Face. In her book "From here and beyond. Silhouettes of Friends'' (1992) wrote a detailed and respectful memory of his beloved teacher. She was noticed by the literary critic Vladimir Vasilev, who strongly invited the future poetess to send poems to the Zlatorog magazine as well. 
She worked in the magazine "Septemvri" as an editor for eight years, after which she went to the Rhodopes for two years. She started working in "Narodna Kultura" as an editor and translator. 
Some of her most famous works are her first novel Journey to Self (1965), her novel Deviation (1967), which was filmed with the participation of actors Nevena Kokanova and Ivan Andonov, the travelogue novel The Last Judgment (1969), written after the little girl Ha Thu Hoang was taken from Haiphong Vietnam. The same year together with Alexander Milev translated from the ancient Greek "Iliad". Followed by the novel "Lavina" (1971) was filmed, the biographical book "The youth of Bagryana and her companions" (1975 co-authored with Yordan Vasilev), "Black and white days. Elisaveta Bagryana - observations and conversations" (1975 co-authored with Yordan Vasilev). 

Along with the prose books, she had her most famous collections of poems:
Until Tomorrow (1959), The World in a Hand (1962), Back in Time (1965), Doomed to Love (1967), Gong (1976), Night Diary (1976), Spaces" (1980), "Voice" (1985) and others. Translated "The Ring of Eternity" (1984) by the three poets: Ana Akhmatova, Gabriela Mistral and Edith Södergran, about whom the poetess Fedya Filkova says: "The three women married with the "ring of eternity", as well as the collection of poems "Contemplating the World" (1998) on Polish Nobel Prize-winning poet Wisława Szymborska. 

Blaga Dimitrova is the author of the script for the film "Deviation". Her play "An Unexpected Meeting" as well as "Dr. Faustina" were performed for years at Theater "199" and in provincial theater salons, and her works have been translated into 23 countries. Blaga Dimitrova left over 80 books, screenplays, essays, interviews, a rich treasury of representative of generations of female authors in Bulgarian literature. Undoubtedly, over the years, some of her work has been met with hostility by ideological censorship. Her novel "Lice" (1981) was confiscated from bookstores and sent to prison in Sliven, along with the book "Fascism" by Zh. Zhelev and "Hot Peppers" by Radoj Ralin.

Works

"Cassandra with a Tail" poem

Anthologies

References

External links

 Michael Basse  : Das Risiko ist die Abweichung. Gedichte von Blaga Dimitrova , Neue Sirene , Munich 2/1994

1922 births
2003 deaths
People from Byala Slatina
Vice presidents of Bulgaria
Sofia University alumni
Bulgarian women writers
Bulgarian biographers
Bulgarian poets
Bulgarian women poets
20th-century poets
20th-century women writers
Herder Prize recipients
Women biographers